Zarafshan Airport  is an airport of entry in Zarafshon, Navoiy Region, Uzbekistan.

Facilities

Airlines and destinations

See also
List of the busiest airports in the former USSR
Transport in Uzbekistan

References

External links
 

Airports in Uzbekistan
Navoiy Region